El Algarrobo Airport ,  is a rural airstrip  up a mountain valley from Cabildo, a town in the Valparaíso Region of Chile.

There is nearby mountainous terrain in all quadrants. The runway has  of unpaved overrun on the north end.

See also

Transport in Chile
List of airports in Chile

References

External links
OpenStreetMap - El Algarrobo
OurAirports - El Algarrobo
SkyVector - El Algarrobo
FallingRain - El Algarrobo Airport

Airports in Valparaíso Region